Gaizhou West railway station is a railway station in Gaizhou, Yingkou, Liaoning, China. It opened along with the Harbin–Dalian high-speed railway on 1 December 2012.

See also
Gaizhou railway station

References

Railway stations in Liaoning
Railway stations in China opened in 2012